The 1997 Japan Open Tennis Championships was a tennis tournament played on outdoor hard courts at the Ariake Coliseum in Tokyo in Japan that was part of the Championship Series of the 1997 ATP Tour and of Tier III of the 1997 WTA Tour. The tournament was held from April 14 through April 21, 1997. Richard Krajicek and Ai Sugiyama won the singles titles.

Finals

Men's singles

 Richard Krajicek defeated  Lionel Roux 6–2, 3–6, 6–1
 It was Krajicek's 2nd title of the year and the 15th of his career.

Women's singles

 Ai Sugiyama defeated  Amy Frazier 4–6, 6–4, 6–4
 It was Sugiyama's 1st title of the year and the 4th of her career.

Men's doubles

 Martin Damm /  Daniel Vacek defeated  Justin Gimelstob /  Patrick Rafter 2–6, 6–2, 7–6
 It was Damm's 2nd title of the year and the 10th of his career. It was Vacek's 2nd title of the year and the 16th of his career.

Women's doubles

 Alexia Dechaume-Balleret /  Rika Hiraki defeated  Kerry-Anne Guse /  Corina Morariu 6–4, 6–2
 It was Dechaume-Balleret's only title of the year and the 6th of her career. It was Hiraki's 2nd title of the year and the 5th of her career.

References

External links
 Official website
 ATP tournament profile

 
Japan Open Tennis Championships
Japan Open Tennis Championships
Japan Open (tennis)
Japan Open Tennis Championships
Japan Open Tennis Championships